Damir Polančec (born 25 June 1967) is a Croatian politician who served as Minister of Economy, Labour and Entrepreneurship from 2008 to 2009, and as Deputy Prime Minister of Croatia from 2005 to 2009, in the cabinets of two prime ministers, Ivo Sanader and Jadranka Kosor.

On 30 October 2009, Polančec resigned citing a need to avoid damaging the Government and the party due to accusations leveled at him for his involvement in the mismanagement of Podravka.

On 30 March 2010, Polančec was apprehended by the police and questioned by USKOK, regarding his involvement in certain financial transactions between Podravka, MOL Group and OTP Bank.
The County Court in Zagreb authorized a longer detention for Polančec and also blocked his estates, at the request of USKOK.

On 15 October 2010, Polančec was sentenced to 15 months in prison for a separate instance of abuse of power, where he approved a fictional expense to a Vukovar-based attorney in return for his clients dropping lawsuits against the government.

References

1967 births
Croatian Democratic Union politicians
Living people
People from Koprivnica
Faculty of Agriculture, University of Zagreb alumni
Economy ministers of Croatia
Economy of Koprivnica
Croatian politicians convicted of corruption